Bend It Like Beckham (also known as Kick It Like Beckham) is a 2002 sports comedy-drama film directed by Gurinder Chadha from a screenplay by Chadha, Paul Mayeda Berges, and Guljit Bindra. The film stars Parminder Nagra, Keira Knightley, Jonathan Rhys Meyers, Anupam Kher, Juliet Stevenson, Shaznay Lewis, and Archie Panjabi. In Bend It Like Beckham, Jesminder Bhamra (Nagra) and Jules Paxton (Knightley) chase careers in professional football despite their parents' wishes.

Development for the film began after Chadha, Bindra, and Berges completed the screenplay by early 2001. Nagra and Knightley were hired soon after, with casting rounded out with the additions of Meyers, Kher, Stevenson, Lewis, and Panjabi by that May. Principal photography began in June 2001 and lasted until that September, with filming locations including London, Shepperton Studios, and Hamburg. Production collaborated with The Football Association, while the film's title refers to David Beckham's curling free kick technique.

Bend It Like Beckham was theatrically released first in the United Kingdom on 12 April 2002 by Redbus Film Distribution. The film received generally positive reviews from critics, with praise for the screenplay, light-hearted tone, and commentary on South Asian social norms and culture. Bend It Like Beckham grossed $76.6 million at the box office, making it the highest-grossing football sports film. In 2015, it was adapted into a stage musical that opened at the Phoenix Theatre.

Plot
Jesminder "Jess" Bhamra is the daughter of British Indian Punjabi  Sikhs living in Hounslow, London. Jess is infatuated with football, but her parents do not support her interest. However, she sometimes plays in the park with boys, including her best friend, Tony, who is gay although her family thinks he has his eye on her. Her family is occupied with planning for Jess's sister Pinky's imminent wedding.

Jules Paxton, a member of the Hounslow Harriers, a local women's amateur football team, notices Jess's football skills, befriends her, and invites her to try out for the team. The coach, Joe—a young Irish former player whose own career was derailed by injuries—accepts her onto the team. Although Jess's parents (mainly her mother) forbid her to join the team, she plays behind their backs, claiming to have a part-time job when she is actually at football practice. When he learns that Jess is on the team without her parents' permission, Joe pleads with Mr. Bhamra to allow Jess to play, but he refuses, revealing that he does not want Jess to suffer the way he did when he was excluded from a cricket club because of anti-Indian sentiment.

With Pinky covering for her, Jess travels with the team to play a match in Germany; the Harriers lose the match after Jess fails to score on a penalty kick. When they go out clubbing in Hamburg after the match, Jules catches Joe and Jess about to kiss. This sours the two girls' friendship, as Jules also is attracted to Joe. Furthermore, Jess's parents find out she is still on the team by seeing a newspaper article about the Hamburg match. After returning, Jess goes to Jules's house to try to patch up their friendship, but Jules's mother, confused by overhearing only parts of an argument, thinks they are hiding a lesbian relationship.

Jess's father secretly attends one of her games, and sees Jess mocked with a racial slur by an opposing player, and Joe hugging her afterward to comfort her. The Harriers qualify for the finals of the league tournament, but the championship match—with an American talent scout in attendance—is to be held on the same day as Pinky's wedding, so Jess resigns herself to missing the game. At Pinky's wedding Jess is visibly miserable; her father tells her to go to the game so she can be happy on her sister's wedding day. The Harriers are behind 1–0 when Jess arrives, but they rally, and eventually Jess wins the game with a free kick. The scout offers Jess and Jules sports scholarships at Santa Clara University in California. Jules and Jess share a hug and kiss to celebrate, furthering Jules's mother's suspicions. Jess returns to the wedding, now able to celebrate. Jules's mother gives Jules a ride to the wedding as well, but when they arrive, Mrs. Paxton accuses Jess of being a hypocrite and a lesbian. Jules drags her mother away, angrily clarifying her relationship with Jess.

Later that day, Jess has still not told her parents about the scholarship; she is afraid they might not allow her to go to the United States on her own. Tony, out of friendship for Jess, decides to lie to the family and tell them he is engaged to Jess as long as she gets to go to any college she wants. The Bhamras happily accept, but Jess immediately confesses the truth. Jess's mother ignores Jess's heartfelt speech and scolds Jess's father for letting Jess leave Pinky's wedding. But her father announces he doesn't want Jess to suffer as he did, and accepts her desire to play football. Jess runs to the football field to tell Joe of her parents' decision. The two almost kiss, but Jess pulls away, saying her parents would object, and that although they had come far enough to let her go to America to play, she doesn't think they would be able to handle another cultural rebellion from her.

On the day of Jess and Jules's flight to America, the two are about to board the plane when Joe arrives and confesses his love for Jess. The two kiss and Jess agrees to sort out their relationship (and her parents) when she returns for Christmas. While at the airport, they see David Beckham with his wife Victoria, which Jules takes as a sign. Then the two leave through the gate giving happy waves to their families.

While Jess and Jules are away, Mr and Mrs. Paxton patch up their relationship, Pinky becomes pregnant and Mr. Bhamra gets back into playing cricket with Joe.

Cast

Production
Gurinder Chadha co-wrote the script with Guljit Bindra and screenwriting partner Paul Mayeda Berges. Nayar and Chadha actively pursued financing for the film at Sundance Film Festival. Having previously worked with Road Movies, a German production company on several other projects, Nayar approached them and they came on board, followed by British Screen and The Film Council. The film is loosely based on the life of Permi Jhooti.

Helkon SK, formerly known as Redbus, picked up the script. Fox Searchlight Pictures picked up the rights for distribution in the United States at the Cannes Film Festival in 2002. For it's American cinema release it was suggested that the title of the movie be changed to Kick it like Mia Hamm, as marketeers were concerned that American audience would be unfamiliar with David Beckham.

Filming
Principal photography began on 18 June 2001. A variety of locations around London and Shepperton Studios, Surrey were used for the nine-week shoot, with the semi-final taking place over a three-day period in Hamburg, Germany.

Casting

Chadha, who played an active role in casting, chose Parminder Nagra and Keira Knightley, who would play the two lead roles in the film, while Archie Panjabi and Jonathan Rhys Meyers were in early talks to join the cast. Shaznay Lewis and Anupam Kher were also in final talks. Juliet Stevenson and Frank Harper joined as Paula Paxton and Alan Paxton, mother and father of Jules.

For the role of Jess's mother, Mrs Bhamra, Chadha turned to Shaheen Khan, whom she had previously cast in Bhaji on the Beach. Anupam Kher, a Bollywood actor, was cast as Mr Bhamra, Jess's father. Chadha worked with The Football Association and ended up casting actual players from a variety of school teams.

Release

Theatrical
Bend It Like Beckham was released theatrically on 12 April 2002 by Redbus Film Distribution. The film then received a limited theatrical release in the United States on 12 March 2003 by Fox Searchlight Pictures. When originally released in the United Kingdom, it topped the country's box office for the next three weekends, before being overtaken by About a Boy.

Home media
The film was released on DVD and VHS on 18 November 2002 by Warner Home Video, and re-released on DVD and VHS on 30 September 2003 in the United States by 20th Century Fox Home Entertainment. Among the DVD bonus features, there are several scenes that did not make the final release. Some include dialogue from Pinky's friends and from Jules, as well as her mother meeting Kevin and his friends outside a shop, which would have been helpful, as Kevin is mentioned three times but is never seen.

On the North American Billboard video charts, the film entered the top ten of the Top DVD Sales and Top DVD Rentals charts, at number six on Top VHS Sales, and number seven on Top VHS Rentals.

In the United Kingdom, it was the sixth most-watched film of 2003 on subscription television, with 810,000 viewers on Sky Premier that year. It was later the most-watched film on UK television during the first half of 2005, with  viewers on BBC1 during that period. Combined, the film drew at least  UK viewership during 2003 and 2005.

Reception

Critical response
Bend It Like Beckham surprised critics and met with mostly positive reviews. Review aggregation website Rotten Tomatoes gives the film a score of 85% based on 154 reviews, with an average rating of 7.2/10. The consensus states, "Inspiring, compassionate, and with a sly undercurrent of social commentary, Bend It Like Beckham is a lively feel-good movie that genuinely charms." Metacritic gave the movie a score of 66 based on 32 reviews, indicating "generally favorable reviews".

Kenneth Turan of the Los Angeles Times noted that the film "was really full of easy humor, an impeccable sense of milieu that is the result of knowing the culture intimately enough to poke fun at it while understanding its underlying integrity."

The Times of India noted the film's social context, saying, "[it] is really about the bending of rules, social paradigms and lives – all to finally curl that ball, bending it like Beckham, through the goalpost of ambition.... The creeping divide shows that Britain is changing, but hasn't quite changed yet. The stiff upper lip has travelled miles from the time Chadha's father was denied a pint at some pubs at Southall, but like dollops of coagulated spice in badly stirred curry, discrimination crops up to spoil the taste, every now and then, in multi-racial Britain."

Planet Bollywood gave the film a mark of 9 out of 10: the "screenplay not only explores the development of Jess as a person, but also the changing values and culture of NRI teens: Jess's urge to break the social norm of the Indian home-maker, her sister's (Archie Punjabi) sexually active relationship, and the gay Indian [Tony, played by Ameet Chana]."

The Hindu argued, "If ever there is a film that is positive, realistic and yet delightful, then it has to be Dream Production's latest venture directed by Gurinder Chadha... Light-hearted, without taking away the considerable substance in terms of values, attitudes and the love for sport, the film just goes to prove that there are ways to be convincing and honest."

Jamie Russell at the BBC gave it 4 out of 5 stars, and argued that "Mr Beckham ought to be proud to have his name on such a great film." The British film was distributed by iDream Productions in India, and went on to set the record in India for most tickets sold during a single weekend for a foreign movie.

Box office
In the United Kingdom, the film grossed over £11million, making it one of the highest-grossing Black/Asian-themed British films. With  in US box office revenue, Bend It Like Beckham became the highest-grossing Indian-themed film in the United States since Gandhi (1982). At the time of its release, Bend It Like Beckham became the highest-grossing association football themed sports film in the United States; it remains the third highest-grossing film there in this genre (behind Kicking & Screaming and She's the Man). The film grossed  worldwide.

Accolades

Wins
 2004 Pyongyang Film Festival: Music Prize
 2002 Bordeaux International Feminine Film Festival: Best actress, Special Jury Prize, Audience Award
 2002 British Comedy Awards: Best comedy film
 2003 ESPY Awards: Best Sports Movie ESPY Award
 2004 GLAAD Media Awards: Outstanding Film – Wide Release

Nominations
 2006 Billie Award – Entertainment (Best film)
 2004 Writers Guild of America Award – Best Screenplay
 2003 British Academy of Film and Television Arts – Best Film
 2003 Golden Globe for Best Film – Musical or Comedy
 2002 Locarno International Film Festival: Audience Award – Gurinder Chadha
 2002 London Film Critics Circle Awards: British Newcomer of the Year – Keira Knightley
 2002 International Film Festival of Marrakech: Special Jury Award – Gurinder Chadha
 2003 National Board of Review of Motion Pictures: Special Recognition
 2002 Sydney Film Festival: PRIX UIP – Gurinder Chadha
 2003 The Comedy Festival: Film Discovery Jury Award – Gurinder Chadha

Soundtrack

The release of the soundtrack in the United Kingdom features bhangra music, and songs by the Spice Girls' Victoria Beckham and Melanie C and rock band Texas. It also features "Baddest Ruffest" by Backyard Dog, the aria Nessun Dorma, from Puccini's Turandot and excerpts from dance band Basement Jaxx. The USA release rearranges the tracks and excludes some material. "Dream the Dream" appears in the movie but did not make the final cut on the soundtrack.

Release (United Kingdom)
 Craig Pruess & Bally Sagoo Feat. Gunjan – "Titles"
 Blondie – "Atomic"
 Backyard Dog – "Baddest Ruffest"
 B21 – "Darshan"
 (Movie Dialogue) – "It's Beckham's Corner"
 Victoria Beckham – "I Wish"
 (Movie Dialogue) – "Learn To Cook Dahl"
 Malkit Singh – "Jind Mahi"
 Nusrat Fateh Ali Khan – "Tere Bin Nahin Lagda"
 Bally Sagoo Feat Gunjan – "Noorie"
 (Movie Dialogue) – "Juicy Juicy Mangoes"
 Basement Jaxx – "Do Your Thing"
 (Movie Dialogue) – "Eyes Down"
 Texas – "Inner Smile"
 Melanie C – "Independence Day"
 (Movie Dialogue) – "Can't Make Round Chapattis"
 Hans Raj Hans – "Punjabiyan Di Shaan"
 Gunjan – "Kinna Sohna"
 Tito Beltrán – "Nessun Dorma"
 (Movie Dialogue) – "The Offside Rule Is"
 Bina Mistry – "Hot Hot Hot"
 Craig Pruess & Bally Sagoo Feat. Gunjan – "Hai Raba!"
 Curtis Mayfield – "Move on Up"

Release (United States)
 Craig Pruess & Bally Sagoo Feat. Gunjan – "Titles"
(Movie Dialogue) – "It's Beckham's Corner"
 Texas – "Inner Smile"
 Malkit Singh – "Jind Mahi"
 Bally Sagoo Feat Gunjan – "Noorie"
 (Movie Dialogue) – "Learn To Cook Dahl"
 Victoria Beckham – "I Wish"
 (Movie Dialogue) – "Juicy Juicy Mangoes"
 Gunjan – "Kinna Sohna"
 Partners in Rhyme (featuring Nusrat Fateh Ali Khan) – "Tere Bin Nahin Lagda"
 (Movie Dialogue) – "Can't Make Round Chapattis"
 Melanie C – "Independence Day"
 B21 – "Darshan"
 (Movie Dialogue) – "Eyes Down"
 Bina Mistry – "Hot Hot Hot"
 Blondie – "Atomic"
 Craig Pruess & Bally Sagoo Feat. Gunjan – "Hai Raba!"
 Tito Beltrán – "Nessun Dorma"

North Korean broadcast
To mark the tenth anniversary of North Korea's relations with the United Kingdom, an edited version of Bend It Like Beckham was broadcast on North Korean state television on 26 December 2010, Boxing Day. The British Ambassador to South Korea, Martin Uden, said it was the "first ever Western-made film to air on television" in North Korea.

Stage musical

A stage musical version of the film opened at London's Phoenix Theatre in June 2015.

On 7 May 2019 it was announced that the stage production, which debuted in London's West End, would have its North American premiere in Toronto, with a limited run at the St. Lawrence Centre for the Arts' Bluma Appel Theatre beginning in December 2019.

References

External links

 
 
 
 
 

2002 films
2002 comedy-drama films
2002 in women's association football
2002 independent films
2002 LGBT-related films
2000s buddy comedy-drama films
2000s coming-of-age comedy-drama films
2000s female buddy films
2002 romantic comedy-drama films
2000s sports comedy-drama films
2000s teen comedy-drama films
2000s teen romance films
American association football films
American buddy comedy-drama films
American coming-of-age comedy-drama films
American female buddy films
American independent films
American romantic comedy-drama films
American sports comedy-drama films
American teen comedy-drama films
American teen LGBT-related films
American LGBT-related films
American teen romance films
British association football films
British coming-of-age comedy-drama films
British female buddy films
British independent films
British Indian films
British romantic comedy-drama films
British sports comedy-drama films
British teen comedy-drama films
British teen LGBT-related films
British teen romance films
Coming-of-age romance films
Cultural depictions of David Beckham
2000s English-language films
English-language German films
Films about immigration
Films about Indian weddings
Films about Sikhism
Films about women in the Indian diaspora
Films directed by Gurinder Chadha
Films set in London
Films shot in London
Films with screenplays by Gurinder Chadha
Films with screenplays by Paul Mayeda Berges
Fox Searchlight Pictures films
German association football films
German coming-of-age comedy-drama films
German independent films
German LGBT-related films
German romantic comedy-drama films
German sports comedy-drama films
German teen comedy-drama films
LGBT-related romantic comedy-drama films
LGBT-related sports comedy-drama films
Women's association football films
Teen sports films
2000s American films
2000s British films
2000s German films